St Mary's College is a boys secondary school in Galway, Ireland. It educates students aged 12 to 18 for the Junior and Leaving Certificate examinations. It was founded in 1912 as the junior seminary of the Roman Catholic Galway and Kilmacduagh dioceses.  St Mary's College retains the status of diocesan college although it ended its boarding provision in 1999. The college currently caters to approximately 400 students, offering a wide and varied range of curricular subjects and many co-curricular and extra-curricular activities.

The school celebrated its centennial in 2012, celebrating the completion of its main building in March 1912.  The building is faced with granite and limestone, the two predominant stones of County Galway's geology.

Former students
Former students include former Fianna Fáil government minister Frank Fahey, the actor Mick Lally and deceased Bishop of Galway, James McLoughlin. Former students in the sports news include Galway Gaelic footballers Paul Conroy, Eddie Hoare, Gareth Bradshaw, Dessie Conneely and David Wynne, soccer players Stephen O'Donnell (Dundalk AFC captain) and Vinny Faherty and Galway hurlers Joe Connolly, Fergal Moore, Cathal Jordan, Tadhg Haran, Dean Higgins and Tony Og Regan. Mary's men in Politics include Seán Kyne TD, Noel Grealish TD, Derek Nolan and James Charity.

Merger
St Mary's college is expected to become a co-educational secondary school in September 2021 following a merger with Our Lady's College, bringing the school's enrolment to over 1,000 students.

External links
 School's official website
 St. Mary's College on Department of Education website.
 All change as St Mary’s College amalgamates with Our Lady’s

Boys' schools in the Republic of Ireland
Buildings and structures in Galway (city)
Educational institutions established in 1912
Education in Galway (city)
Secondary schools in County Galway
1912 establishments in Ireland